The Vaalharts Irrigation Scheme is one of the largest irrigation schemes in the world covering 369.50 square kilometres in the Northern Cape Province of South Africa. It is named after the Vaal River and the Harts River, the Vaal River being its major tributary.

Water from a diversion weir in the Vaal River, near Warrenton, flows through a 1,176 km long network of canals. This system provides irrigation water to a total of 39,820ha scheduled land, industrial water to six towns and other industrial water users. This farmland is divided into individual blocks which each have their own letter, or letter group for identification. The blocks are divided into streets which have numbers that count up from the first one out. The canals divide into all of the blocks and the streets. There are a total of 6 plots per street and each plot also has a number from one to six. To reference a specific plot, you take the plot number, follow it up with the block letter and then the street number. e.g. 3 G 13. Each plot feeds off of the canal into their own dams with their own hatch from the canal. The water then goes through pumps to be sprinkled across the farmland. The most popular method to do this is with pivots.

See also
Hartswater
 Windsorton

References

External links
Vaalharts Irrigation Scheme Study, South Africa

Northern Cape
Irrigation projects
Irrigation in South Africa
Vaal River